Big Ben Chor Praram 6 (Thai: บิ๊กเบน ช.พระราม 6) is a Thai Muay Thai kickboxer. He is the former Rajadamnern Stadium, WMC and W.B.C. Muaythai Champion.

Biography and career

Big Ben Chor Praram 6 (บิ๊กเบน ช.พระราม 6) is one of the most famous Thai fighters, known for his rough fighting style and his punching power, winning many victories by KO. He has beat big names of muaythai such as Lamsongkram Chuwattana, Jean-Charles Skarbowsky, Noppadeth, Abdallah Mabel. He is a form WMC, WBC Muaythai world champion and Rajadamnern Stadium champion.

Titles and achievements

 2012 WMAF World Super Lightweight Champion
 2008 W.B.C. Muaythai World Welterweight Champion (147 lbs)
 2006 WMC World Junior Middleweight Champion (154 lbs)
 2006 Rajadamnern Stadium Light Middleweight Champion (154 lbs)
 2003 Thailand Welterweight Champion (147 lbs)
 2008 Rajadamnern Stadium Welterweight Champion (147 lbs)

Muaythai record

|-  style="background:#FFBBBB"
| 2012-06-09 || Loss ||align=left| Fabio Pinca || WBC Battle of the belts || Bangkok, Thailand || Decision || 5 || 3:00
|-
! style=background:white colspan=9 |
|-
|-  style="background:#CCFFCC"
| 2012-03-18 || Win ||align=left| Kazuki || Break 24 Sagittarius || Tokyo, Japan || Decision (3-0) || 5 || 3:00
|-
! style=background:white colspan=9 |
|-
|-  style="background:#CCFFCC"
| 2011-11-04 || Win ||align=left| Lomisan Sor. Chokkitchai || WBC Muaythai Gala || Bangkok, Thailand || KO || 1 || 
|-
! style=background:white colspan=9 |
|-
|-  style="background:#FFBBBB"
| 2010-12-18 || Loss ||align=left| Ji Haitong || Bruce Lee 70th Birthday Celebrations || Shun De, China || Decision || 5 || 3:00
|-
|-  style="background:#FFBBBB"
| 2010-11-04 || Loss ||align=left| Sudsakorn Sor Klinmee || Fairtex Theprasit Boxing Stadium || Pattaya, Thailand || KO || 2 ||
|-  style="background:#FFBBBB"
| 2010-07-12 || Loss ||align=left| Youssef Boughanem || Fairtex Theprasit Boxing Stadium || Pattaya, Thailand || Decision || 5 || 3:00
|-  style="background:#FFBBBB"
| 2010-04-22 || Loss ||align=left| Omsinlek Sitjekarn || Jarumuang Fight, Rajadamnern Stadium || Bangkok, Thailand || TKO || 3 ||
|-  style="background:#CCFFCC"
| 2009-12-19 || Win ||align=left| Dong Wenfei || Chinese Kung Fu vs Muaythai Competition at Lingnan Pearl Stadium || Foshan, China || Decision (Unanimous) || 5 || 3:00
|-  style="background:#CCFFCC"
| 2009-11-28 || Win ||align=left| Abdallah Mabel || A-1 World Cup Combat Lyon || Lyon, France || KO (Elbow) || 1 || 
|-
! style=background:white colspan=9 |
|-
|-  style="background:#CCFFCC"
| 2009-09-21 || Win ||align=left| Singyok Sor. Sisan || Daorungchujaroen Fight, Rajadamnern Stadium || Bangkok, Thailand || Decision (Unanimous) || 5 || 3:00
|-
! style=background:white colspan=9 |
|-
|-  style="background:#FFBBBB"
| 2009-03-26 || Loss ||align=left| Yohan Lidon || Les stars du Ring || Levallois, France || KO || 1 || 
|-
|-  bgcolor="#fbb"
| 2009-01-19 || Loss||align=left| Singmanee Kaewsamrit || Daorungchujaroen Fights, Rajadamnern Stadium || Bangkok, Thailand || Decision || 5 || 3:00
|-
|-  style="background:#FFBBBB"
| 2008-09-22 || Loss ||align=left| Khem Fairtex || Daorungchujarern Fights, Rajadamnern Stadium || Bangkok, Thailand || Decision (Unanimous) || 5 || 3:00
|-  style="background:#CCFFCC"
| 2008-08-04 || Win ||align=left| Noppadeth 2 Chuwatthana || Daorungchujarern Fights, Rajadamnern Stadium || Bangkok, Thailand || Decision (Unanimous) || 5 || 3:00
|-
! style=background:white colspan=9 |
|-
|-  bgcolor="#fbb"
| 2008-05 || Loss||align=left| Diesellek Lekrungruangyon || Rajadamnern Stadium || Bangkok, Thailand || Decision || 5 || 3:00 
|-
! style=background:white colspan=9 |

|-  bgcolor="#cfc"
| 2008-03-26 || Win ||align=left| Katapetch Petchphothong || Bangrachan, Rajadamnern Stadium || Bangkok, Thailand || Decision || 5 || 3:00 

|-  bgcolor="#fbb"
| 2008-02-25 || Loss||align=left| Diesellek Lekrungruangyon || Jarumueng , Rajadamnern Stadium || Bangkok, Thailand || Decision || 5 || 3:00 

|-  bgcolor="#cfc"
| 2008-02-04 || Win ||align=left| Singsiri Por.Sirichai || Chucharoen, Rajadamnern Stadium || Bangkok, Thailand || KO || 2 ||  

|-  bgcolor="#fbb"
| 2007-12-30 || Loss||align=left| Diesellek Lekrungruangyon || Chucharoen + True Visions 62, Rajadamnern Stadium || Bangkok, Thailand || Decision || 5 || 3:00 

|-  style="background:#FFBBBB"
| 2007-10-28 || Loss ||align=left| Hiroki Shishido || Shoot Boxing Battle Summit "Ground Zero" || Tokyo, Japan || Decision (Unanimous) || 3 || 3:00
|-  style="background:#CCFFCC"
| 2007-07-26 || Win ||align=left| Uan Phoenix Gym || Deep : Glove || Tokyo, Japan || Decision (Majority) || 3 || 3:00
|-  style="background:#CCFFCC"
| 2007-03-29 || Win ||align=left| Karuhas Eakchumpon || Jarumueng Fights, Rajadamnern Stadium || Bangkok, Thailand || Decision || 5 || 3:00
|-  style="background:#CCFFCC"
| 2007-02-25 || Win ||align=left| Kenichi Ogata || Shoot Boxing 2007 Mu-So 1st || Bunkyo, Tokyo, Japan || KO (Right Hook) || 2 || 1:04
|-  style="background:#FFBBBB"
| 2006-10-16 || Loss ||align=left| Naruepol Fairtex || Daowrungchujarern Fights, Rajadamnern Stadium || Bangkok, Thailand || Decision (Unanimous) || 5 || 3:00
|-  style="background:#CCFFCC"
| 2006-06-29 || Win ||align=left| Jean-Charles Skarbowsky || Jarumueang Fights, Rajadamnern Stadium || Bangkok, Thailand || TKO (Ref stop/elbow strike) || 1 || 2:45

|-  style="background:#FFBBBB"
| 2005-04-09 || Loss ||align=left| Fikri Tijarti || Muay Thai Champions League 14 || Amsterdam, Netherlands || TKO (Doctor stoppage) ||  ||
|-
! style=background:white colspan=9 |
|-  style="background:#FFBBBB"
| 2005-01-06 || Loss ||align=left| Mawin Nakontongparkview || Daorungchujarean Fights, Rajadamnern Stadium || Bangkok, Thailand || TKO || 3 ||
|-  style="background:#CCFFCC"
| 2004-12-13 || Win ||align=left| Thaveesub Sitsengaroon || Daorungchujarean Fights, Rajadamnern Stadium || Bangkok, Thailand || Decision (Unanimous) || 5 || 3:00
|-  style="background:#CCFFCC"
| 2004-10-27 || Win ||align=left| Rodtung V.Taveekiat || Daorungchujarean Fights, Rajadamnern Stadium || Bangkok, Thailand || Decision (Unanimous) || 5 || 3:00
|-  style="background:#CCFFCC"
| 2004-07-28 || Win ||align=left| Rodtung V.Taveekiat || Daorungchujarean Fights, Rajadamnern Stadium || Bangkok, Thailand || Decision (Unanimous) || 5 || 3:00
|-  style="background:#CCFFCC"
| 2004-05-31 || Win ||align=left| Charnvit Kiat T.B.Ubon || Daorungchujarean Fights, Rajadamnern Stadium || Bangkok, Thailand || TKO || 3 || 
|-  style="background:#CCFFCC"
| 2004-02-23 || Win ||align=left| Berneung Topkingboxing || Daorungchujarean + Jarumueang Fights, Rajadamnern Stadium || Bangkok, Thailand || Decision (Unanimous) || 5 || 3:00
|-  style="background:#FFBBBB"
| 2004-01-01 || Loss ||align=left| Oomsin Sitkuanaim || SUK Daorungchujarean+Charumueang, Rajadamnern Stadium || Bangkok, Thailand || TKO || 1 ||
|-  style="background:#c5d2ea"
| 2003-12-11 || Draw ||align=left| Berneung Topkingboxing || SUK Daorungchujarean, Rajadamnern Stadium || Bangkok, Thailand || Decision draw || 5 || 3:00
|-  style="background:#CCFFCC"
| 2003-11-03 || Win ||align=left| Jakkawanlak Saktewan || Daorungchujarean+Charumueang, Rajadamnern Stadium || Bangkok, Thailand || TKO || 3 || 
|-  style="background:#CCFFCC"
| 2003-09-29 || Win ||align=left| Sayan Chuwattana || SUK Daorungchujarean, Rajadamnern Stadium || Bangkok, Thailand || Decision (Unanimous) || 5 || 3:00
|-
! style=background:white colspan=9 |
|-
|-  style="background:#FFBBBB"
| 2003-08-27 || Loss ||align=left| Berneung Topkingboxing || SUK Daorungchujarean, Rajadamnern Stadium || Bangkok, Thailand || Decision (Unanimous) || 5 || 3:00
|-  style="background:#FFBBBB"
| 2003-07-21 || Loss ||align=left| Yokkao Bauchaurau2 || Suk Daorungchujarearn & Jarumueang, Rajadamnern Stadium || Bangkok, Thailand || Decision (Unanimous) || 5 || 3:00
|-  style="background:#CCFFCC"
| 2003-01-27 || Win ||align=left| Fuji Chalmsak || Rajadamnern Stadium || Bangkok, Thailand || Decision (Unanimous) || 5 || 3:00
|-
! style=background:white colspan=9 |
|-
|-  style="background:#CCFFCC"
| 2002-11-11 || Win ||align=left| Lamsongkram Chuwattana || Rajadamnern Stadium || Bangkok, Thailand || TKO || 2 || 
|-
|-  style="background:#FFBBBB"
| 2002-03-24 || Loss ||align=left| Kozo Takeda || Korakuen Hall || Tokyo, Japan || KO (Lowkicks) || 3 || 
|-
| colspan=9 | Legend:

See also 
List of male kickboxers

References

Living people
Welterweight kickboxers
Big Ben Chor Praram 6
Year of birth missing (living people)